Kent Des Moines station is a future station on Sound Transit's Federal Way Link Extension, part of the Link light rail system. It is to be located in western Kent, Washington near Highline College. It is scheduled to open in 2025 as part of the extension of the 1 Line to Federal Way Transit Center.

Location

Kent Des Moines station will be an elevated structure above 30th Avenue South, east of State Route 99 (Pacific Highway) near its intersection with State Route 516 (Kent-Des Moines Road). The station would be located adjacent to Highline College and have a 500-stall parking garage and several temporary surface parking lots that would be redeveloped after the extension to Federal Way opens. The area around the station is planned to be redeveloped with transit-oriented mixed-use development under the "Envision Midway" plan proposed by the city of Kent.

A shopping center to the south of the proposed station was considered for the line's operations and maintenance facility, but the Kent city government passed a zoning ordinance in January 2019 to prevent its use—in part because the shopping center includes a recently opened Dick's Drive-In.

In 2022, the station was officially named Kent Des Moines, replacing its working name of Kent/Des Moines. The name was recommended ahead of Highline station and Highline College station following public polling.

References

External links
Federal Way Link Extension

Future Link light rail stations
Buildings and structures in Kent, Washington
Railway stations scheduled to open in 2025
Link light rail stations in King County, Washington